Rhamphomyia geniculata is a species of dance flies, in the fly family Empididae. It is included in the subgenus Pararhamphomyia.

References

Rhamphomyia
Insects described in 1830
Asilomorph flies of Europe
Taxa named by Johann Wilhelm Meigen